Hydrangea mangshanensis is a species of flowering plant in the family Hydrangeaceae, native to China.

External links
 Hydrangea mangshanensis at www.efloras.org.

mangshanensis
Flora of China